Mama Drama is the third and final studio album released by American rapper Mia X, which was released on October 27, 1998, on No Limit Records, distributed by Priority Records and EMI, and featured production from Master P and Beats By the Pound. Many of the guests who appeared on the previous album returned for guest appearances on the album including Fat Joe and Charlie Wilson. It sold over 2 million units in the US.

Background and singles
The album was Mia X's most successful album commercially and critically, charting at number 7 on the Billboard 200 and number 3 on the Top R&B/Hip-Hop Albums charts. The first single, "What'cha Wanna Do", found success, reaching number 41 on the Billboard Hot 100, number 4 on the Hot Rap Tracks and number 32 on the Hot R&B/Hip-Hop Singles & Tracks. The second single was "Imma Shine".

Track listing
"Bring It On" – 5:10 (featuring Fiend, Mac, Skull Duggery, C-Murder & Mystikal) [produced by KLC]
"What'cha Wanna Do" – 4:40 (featuring Charlie Wilson) [produced by KLC & Craig B)
"Don't Start No Shit" – 3:55 (featuring Master P & C-Murder) [produced by Craig B]
"Mama Drama" – 2:56 (featuring Fiend) [produced by KLC]
"Imma Shine" – 4:03 (featuring O'Dell) [prod. by Craig B]
"I Think Somebody" – 3:03 (featuring Fiend) [produced by KLC]
"Mama's Tribute" – 3:59 (produced by KLC)
"What's Ya Point" – 4:19 (featuring Fat Joe & Snoop Dogg) [produced by Craig B]
"Thugs Like Me" – 3:57 (produced by KLC)
"Ride or Run" – 3:20 (featuring Big Ed & Steady Mobb'n) [produced by Carlos]
"Tru Bitches" – 3:07 (produced by Craig B)
"Puttin' It Down" – 3:55 (featuring Fiend, Mystikal, Mac and Kane & Abel) [produced by KLC]
"Ghetto Livin'" – 4:03 (featuring Ghetto Commission & O'Dell) [produced by Carlos]
"Play Wit Pussy" – 3:47 (featuring Fiend) [produced by KLC]
"Don't Blame Me" – 4:08 (featuring C-Murder & Mr. Serv-On) [produced by Carlos]
"Daddy" – 4:12 (produced by O'dell)
"Like Dat" – 3:58 (produced by Craig B)
"Sex Ed." – 4:44 (featuring Silkk the Shocker) [produced by O'dell]
"Flip & Rip" – 3:18 (featuring Mac) [produced by KLC]
"Fallen Angels" (Dear Jil)" – 3:10 (produced by O'dell)

Credits and personnel
Mia X – vocals, rapping
Craig B. – producer
Big Ed – guest artist, performer, primary artist
Big Man – vocals
Boz – vocals
Carlos – producer
C-Murder composer, guest artist, performer, primary artist
Byron Dollioli – primary artist
Fat Joe  – guest artist, performer, primary artist
Fiend  – featured artist, guest artist, performer, primary artist
Ghetto Commission – guest artist, performer, primary artist
Leslie Henderson – photography
K Lou  – bass
Kane & Abel -performer, primary artist
KLC – producer
M.A.C. – guest artist, primary artist
Mac – primary artist
Larry Mac – composer
Master P – executive producer, guest artist, performer, primary artist
Mr. Serv-On – guest artist, performer, primary artist
Mystikal  – featured artist, guest artist, performer, primary artist
O'Dell – primary artist, producer, vocals
Porsha – vocals
Oliver Scott – composer
Carol Sheridan – photography
Silkk the Shocker – guest artist, primary artist, vocals
Skull Duggrey –  performer, primary artist
Snoop Dogg – composer, guest artist, performer, primary artist
Steady Mobb'n – composer, performer, primary artist
Anita Thomas – vocals
Mark Trentecosta – guitar
Wendy Weary – primary artist, vocals
Ronnie Wilson – composer

Charts

Weekly charts

Year-end charts

References

1998 albums
Mia X albums
No Limit Records albums
Priority Records albums
EMI Records albums